Juybar County is in Mazandaran province, Iran. The capital of the county is the city of Juybar. At the 2006 census, the county's population was 70,204 in 18,276 households. The following census in 2011 counted 73,554 people in 21,697 households. At the 2016 census, the county's population was 77,576 in 25,278 households. Despite its small population, this county is the most prolific in terms of having national champions in wrestling, the national sport of Iran.

Administrative divisions

The population history of Juybar County's administrative divisions over three consecutive censuses is shown in the following table. The latest census shows two districts, four rural districts, and two cities.

References

 

Counties of Mazandaran Province